Polyphylla hammondi, or Hammond's lined June beetle, is a species of scarab beetle in the family Scarabaeidae. It is found in Central America and North America.

References

Further reading

External links

 

Polyphylla
Articles created by Qbugbot
Beetles described in 1856